Francis Patrick Fahy (23 May 1879 – 12 July 1953) was an Irish Fianna Fáil politician who served as Ceann Comhairle of Dáil Éireann from 1932 to 1951. He served as a Teachta Dála (TD) from 1919 to his death in 1953.

He was a Teachta Dála (TD) for 35 years, first for Sinn Féin and later as a member of Fianna Fáil, before becoming Ceann Comhairle (chairman) for over 19 years.

Early life
Fahy was born on 23 May 1879 in the townland of Glanatallin, Kilchreest, County Galway, the eldest of 6 children born to John Fahy and Maria Jones. His father taught at the local National School. After an early education at his father's school in Kilchreest, he attended Mungret College in County Limerick. He later studied at University College Galway. He earned a Bachelor of Arts and a H.Dip. in Education, and a Diploma in Science. From 1906 to 1921 he taught Latin, Irish and Science at Castleknock College (St Vincent's College), Dublin. Fahy qualified as a barrister in 1927 at King's Inns, Dublin and also taught at the Christian Brothers school in Tralee. He was at one time General Secretary of the Conradh na Gaeilge. He married Anna Barton of Tralee, a metal artist and member of the Cumann na mBan in 1908. They had no children.

Political career

Fahy was first elected at the 1918 general election as a Sinn Féin Member of Parliament (MP) for Galway South, but as the party was pledged to abstentionism he did not take his seat in the British House of Commons and joined the revolutionary First Dáil. He was re-elected as TD for Galway in 1921 general election and having sided with the anti-treaty forces following the Anglo-Irish Treaty, he did not take his seat in either the 3rd Dáil or the 4th Dáil. He joined Fianna Fáil when the party was founded in 1926, and along with the 42 other Fianna Fáil TDs he took his seat in the 5th Dáil on 12 August 1927, three days before the Dáil tied 71 votes to 71 on a motion of no confidence in W. T. Cosgrave's Cumann na nGaedheal government (a tie broken by the Ceann Comhairle). After the government won two by-elections later that month, it dissolved the Dáil, leading to a fresh election.

After the September 1927 election, Cosgrave was able to form a minority government with the support of the Farmers' Party and some independent TDs. However, in the 1932 general election, Fianna Fáil won just under half of the seats and formed a government with the support of the Labour Party. The first business was of the 7th Dáil was the election of the Ceann Comhairle, and on 9 March 1932 Fahy was nominated for the position by Seán T. O'Kelly, winning the vote by a margin of 78 to 71.

He held the post until Fianna Fáil lost the 1951 election, and at the start of the 14th Dáil he did not offer himself for re-election as Ceann Comhairle. He was succeeded by the Labour TD Patrick Hogan. His 19 years in the chair remains the longest of any Ceann Comhairle, with the only other person to exceed 10 years as Ceann Comhairle being his successor, Patrick Hogan.

The 1932 election was the last which Fahy contested; as Ceann Comhairle, he was automatically re-elected at the next seven elections. When his Galway constituency was divided for the 1937 general election, he was returned unopposed for the new Galway East, and similarly in 1948 for the new Galway South constituency.

Fahy died on 12 July 1953, and is buried at Deans Grange Cemetery, Dublin. The Galway South by-election held after his death was won by the Fianna Fáil candidate Robert Lahiffe.

References

External links
 
 

 

1879 births
1953 deaths
Alumni of the University of Galway
Burials at Deans Grange Cemetery
Early Sinn Féin TDs
Fianna Fáil TDs
Irish schoolteachers
Members of the Parliament of the United Kingdom for County Galway constituencies (1801–1922)
Members of the 1st Dáil
Members of the 2nd Dáil
Members of the 3rd Dáil
Members of the 4th Dáil
Members of the 5th Dáil
Members of the 6th Dáil
Members of the 7th Dáil
Members of the 8th Dáil
Members of the 9th Dáil
Members of the 10th Dáil
Members of the 11th Dáil
Members of the 12th Dáil
Members of the 13th Dáil
Members of the 14th Dáil
People of the Irish Civil War (Anti-Treaty side)
Presiding officers of Dáil Éireann
Politicians from County Galway
Politicians imprisoned during the Irish revolutionary period
UK MPs 1918–1922
Alumni of King's Inns